The 2021 Berlin state election was held on 26 September 2021 to elect the 19th Abgeordnetenhaus of Berlin. The incumbent government was a coalition of the Social Democratic Party (SPD), The Left, and The Greens led by Governing Mayor Michael Müller. Müller did not run for re-election as Mayor, and former federal minister Franziska Giffey led the SPD in the election. The Berlin expropriation referendum was held on the same day, as well as the Borough council elections who function as the municipal elections of Berlin. 

The SPD remained the largest party with 21.4% of votes cast, recording minimal change compared to 2016. The Greens narrowly surpassed the opposition Christian Democratic Union (CDU) to become the second largest party with 19% of the vote. The Left recorded a small decline to 14%, while the Alternative for Germany (AfD) lost almost half its vote share and finished on 8%. The Free Democratic Party (FDP) remained the smallest party in the Abgeordnetenhaus with 7%.

Post-election, SPD's Giffey and Bettina Jarasch of the Greens both spoke out in favour of a coalition involving their parties. They ultimately renewed the outgoing government with The Left. Franziska Giffey was elected as Governing Mayor on 21 December and her cabinet was sworn in the same day.

Due to numerous irregularities that took place during the election, the Constitutional Court of the State of Berlin annuled the results in November 2022. As a result, repeat elections were scheduled for the next year.

Election date
The last election took place on 18 September 2016. The Abgeordnetenhaus has a term of five years, so the next regular elections must take place no later than September 2021. Federal Minister of the Interior Horst Seehofer recommended that the election take place on the same date as the 2021 German federal election, which took place on 26 September 2021.

Electoral system
The Abgeordnetenhaus is elected via mixed-member proportional representation. 78 members are elected in single-member constituencies via first-past-the-post voting. 52 members are then allocated using compensatory proportional representation, distributed in each of Berlin's twelve boroughs. German voters have two votes: the "first vote" for candidates in single-member constituencies, and the "second vote" for party lists, which are used to fill the proportional seats. The minimum size of the Abgeordnetenhaus is 130 members, but if overhang seats are present, proportional leveling seats will be added to ensure proportionality. An electoral threshold of 5% of valid votes is applied to the Abgeordnetenhaus; parties that fall below this threshold are excluded from the Abgeordnetenhaus. However, parties which win at least one single-member constituency are exempt from the threshold and will be allocated seats proportionally, even if they fall below 5%.

Background

In the previous election held on 13 March 2016, the SPD remained the largest party with 21.6% of the vote, a loss of 6.7 percentage points. The Christian Democratic Union (CDU) was the second largest party with 17.6%, a loss of 5.7 points. The Left overtook The Greens to become the third largest party on 15.6%, while The Greens won 15.2%. Alternative for Germany (AfD) contested their first election in Berlin, winning 14.2%. The Free Democratic Party (FDP) re-entered the Abgeordnetenhaus with 6.7%.

The SPD had led a coalition with the CDU since 2011, but this government lost its majority in the election. The SPD subsequently formed a coalition with The Left and The Greens.

Parties
The table below lists parties currently represented in the 18th Abgeordnetenhaus of Berlin.

Campaign

Lead candidates
On 5 October 2020, the Greens nominated Bettina Jarasch, spokeswoman for integration and refugees, as their lead candidate for the election. She previously served as chairwoman of the state party from 2011 to 2016. She was formally elected as lead candidate on 12 December.

On 9 October, state CDU leader Kai Wegner was selected as his party's lead candidate.

Prior to the election, incumbent mayor Michael Müller voiced his desire to move into federal politics rather than seek another term. On 30 November 2020, the state party executive nominated Federal Minister for Family Affairs, Senior Citizens, Women and Youth Franziska Giffey as lead candidate for the election. She was simultaneously elected co-leader of the Berlin branch of the party alongside parliamentary group leader Raed Saleh.

On 8 December, The Left nominated incumbent Deputy Mayor and Senator for Culture Klaus Lederer as its lead candidate for the election. Lederer is noted as one of the most popular politicians in Berlin, achieving consistently high approval ratings.

On 27 March 2021, the FDP elected parliamentary group leader Sebastian Czaja as their lead candidate for the election.

Opinion polling

Graphical summary

Party polling

Results

By constituency

Aftermath

Government formation
The results showed that the next government would have to consist of three parties, in order to get a majority; all parties ruled out the possibility of working with the AfD. Before the results, the SPD's candidate Franziska Giffey had stated that she was looking to form a coalition involving the CDU and the FDP. Post-election, both the SPD's Giffey and Bettina Jarasch of the Greens spoke out in favour of a coalition involving their parties but differed on a third partner, as Giffey favoured a traffic light coalition with the FDP, while the Greens voiced their desire to renew the incumbent red–red–green coalition with The Left. Giffey faced resistance within her party for her stance. The SPD and Greens agreed to seek preliminary discussions with both the FDP and Left. On 14 October, Giffey announced that the SPD would enter coalition negotiations with the Greens and The Left.

The three parties finalised a coalition agreement on 28 November. It was approved by 91.5% of delegates at an SPD congress on 5 December. On, 12 December, it was passed by the Greens congress 96.4% approval. The Left carried out a membership ballot on the coalition pact. Most party representatives endorsed the agreement, though some, such as Katalin Gennburg, campaigned against it. The results were announced on 17 December, with 74.9% of members voting in favour of the agreement.

Giffey was elected as Governing Mayor by the Abgeordnetenhaus on 21 December, winning 84 votes out of 139 votes. The Giffey senate, comprising four SPD, three Green, three Left, and one independent senator, was sworn in the same day.

Irregularities and annulment

Numerous irregularities were reported during the elections in Berlin, including shortages of ballot papers, unusually long queues to vote, ballots being delivered to the wrong locations, and in some cases voters being turned away or offered only ballot papers for the federal election. Problems were exacerbated by a marathon taking place in the city on the same day. Irregularities were especially common in the Charlottenburg-Wilmersdorf and Friedrichshain districts. State electoral officer Petra Michaelis resigned three days after the election, taking responsibility for the failures in the election process. The state interior minister announced an inquiry into the events and stated that investigations would take place concerning incidents at approximately 100 of Berlin's 2,245 polling stations. This was later revised to 207 of 2,257 polling stations. Reviews and corrections are considered unlikely to change the overall results of the state or federal elections, but may affect the outcome of results in the Charlottenburg-Wilmersdorf 6 and Marzahn-Hellersdorf 1 constituencies for the state election. Preliminary results showed the SPD candidate ahead by 8 votes in Charlottenburg-Wilmersdorf 6; a recount saw the seat flip to the Greens by a margin of 23 votes. The new result was later certified by the electoral office.

On 22 November, the state electoral committee and interior ministry requested that the Constitutional Court of the State of Berlin rule on the validity of the election results in the Pankow 3, Charlottenburg-Wilmersdorf 6, and Marzahn-Hellersdorf 1 constituencies. The court may determine that a repeat of the elections is necessary in the affected constituencies; it is expected to take several months to deliver its verdict. The interior ministry clarified that, although irregularities were recorded in many constituencies, they were only significant enough to change the result in the three specified. Nonetheless, the state government plans to establish an expert committee to investigate the irregularities.

After months of investigation and hearings, on 28 September 2022, the Constitutional Court of the State of Berlin issued a preliminary assessment declaring that a full repeat of the both the state and district council elections was likely necessary. The court handed down its official ruling on 16 November, voiding the results and mandating a new election within 90 days.The president of the court  stated that the frequency and gravity of irregularities were severe enough to affect the outcome of the results, and that serious systemic flaws were present during preparation for the election.

The new election must take place within 90 days – 14 February 2023 at the latest. A likely date is Sunday 12 February. The repeat election will not reset the legislative period, meaning another full state election must still take place in 2026 or earlier.

In addition, the Election Audit Committee of the Bundestag reviewed the findings of the Berlin Constitutional Court to determine whether a repeat of the federal election was required in Berlin. On 7 November, the committee recommended that the elections be repeated in 431 affected polling stations. This was put forward by the governing coalition of the SPD, Greens, and FDP, who formed the majority in the committee. The CDU/CSU and AfD factions opposed this, insisting that a full repeat in the six affected constituencies should take place. The committee's recommendation was approved by the Bundestag on 10 November. Due to a differing process and anticipated legal challenges which could bring the issue before the Federal Constitutional Court, any repeat of the federal election in Berlin is unlikely to take place for a longer period of time, and may be delayed to 2024.

See also
 2021 Berlin referendum

Notes

References

External links

2021 elections in Germany
Elections in Berlin
Opinion polling in Germany
2021 in Berlin
Annulled elections